Geneva High School may refer to:

Geneva High School (Alabama), Geneva, Alabama
Geneva High School (New York), Geneva, New York
Geneva High School (Ohio), Geneva, Ohio
Geneva Community High School, Geneva, Illinois